The Milton Campos Law School (Portuguese:  is a private law school in the Brazilian state of Minas Gerais. Founded in 1975, it is one of the country's most prestigious law school. Several students from Milton Campos have achieved important positions in the Brazilian society. Earning a bachelor's degree (LL.B.) takes at least five years and eventual post-graduate diplomas (advanced university degrees in law) are completed in addition to the regular five-year program.

The graduates from Milton Campos Law School are among the most requested by the Brazilian professional market, according to the 'University Ranking' (RUF) of the newspaper .

In addition, Milton leads the ranking of the Brazilian Bar examination, known as "Ordem dos Advogados do Brasil - OAB" (Order of Attorneys of Brazil) among all private institutions in the state of Minas Gerais and also ranks the third position in the national ranking among all private institutions.

Notes

External links 

Law schools in Brazil